Roderick O'Connor (1910 – 23 January 2000) was a nationalist politician in Northern Ireland.

O'Connor was a solicitor and a director of the Ulster Herald series of newspapers.  He became active in the Nationalist Party and sat on various boards in County Tyrone.

O'Connor was elected at the 1949 Northern Ireland general election for West Tyrone, and held his seat at each subsequent election, until the Parliament of Northern Ireland was abolished in 1972.  In 1958, he worked with Eddie McAteer to prevent the Nationalist Party becoming the official opposition at Stormont.  When, in 1965, they finally accepted the role, O'Connor became the Opposition Chief Whip and the Shadow Minister of Home Affairs.  In 1969, he became the final Chairman of the Nationalist Party at Stormont.

References

1910 births
2000 deaths
Members of the House of Commons of Northern Ireland 1949–1953
Members of the House of Commons of Northern Ireland 1953–1958
Members of the House of Commons of Northern Ireland 1958–1962
Members of the House of Commons of Northern Ireland 1962–1965
Members of the House of Commons of Northern Ireland 1965–1969
Members of the House of Commons of Northern Ireland 1969–1973
Nationalist Party (Ireland) members of the House of Commons of Northern Ireland
Members of the House of Commons of Northern Ireland for County Tyrone constituencies